Fauroux is a commune in the Tarn-et-Garonne department in the Occitanie region in southern France.

Geography
The Séoune forms part of the commune's south-eastern border, then flows southwestward through the southern part of the commune.

See also
Communes of the Tarn-et-Garonne department

References

Communes of Tarn-et-Garonne